Under Texas Skies is a 1930 American Western film directed by J.P. McGowan.

Cast 
Bob Custer as Bob Bainbridge - Posing as Rankin
Natalie Kingston as Joan Prescott
Bill Cody as Army Captain Jack Hartford
Tom London as The Boss / Captain Hartford
Lane Chandler as "Singer" Martin (Secret Service agent)
Bob Roper as Dummy (the mute brute)
William McCall as Deputy Marshal Walsh
Joe Smith Marba as Sheriff H. Moody

Plot
Joan Prescott has a contract to sell her horses to Captain Hartford for the U.S. Army. The man she knows as Hartford is actually an impostor who has arranged for the horses to be stolen, with the theft blamed on Tom Rankin. Rankin eventually recovers the horses and reveals that he is the real Hartford.

Production 
In addition to McGowan as director, W. Ray Johnson was the producer. Arthur A. Brooks was the editor, Otto Himm was the cinematographer, and G. A. Durlam was the screenwriter.

References

External links 

1930 films
1930 Western (genre) films
1930s English-language films
American black-and-white films
Films directed by J. P. McGowan
American Western (genre) films
1930s American films